Naida Akšamija  is a Bosnian figure skater. She is the 2001 & 2007 Bosnian and Herzegovinian national champion. She placed 27th in the qualifying round at the 2006 World Junior Figure Skating Championships.

Education

Akšamija graduated from grammar school in Bosnia and Herzegovina, Prva bosnjacka gimnazija. She graduated from Bocconi University in Milan, Italy.

External links
 

Bosnia and Herzegovina figure skaters
Sportspeople from Sarajevo
Living people
1991 births